"Bridging the Gap" is a single from  Nas' Street's Disciple, and features his father, Olu Dara. The second single from Street's Disciple, it samples music from Muddy Waters' "Mannish Boy" composition. Olu Dara provides the hook of the song by talking about his path and how Nas was born. 

Nas and Olu Dara performed the song many times before the release of Street's Disciple, generating buzz as the release of the album drew near. The song is referenced in the title track of The Game's song "The Documentary", when he says, "Now I understand why Nas did a song with his pops". The song peaked at #94 on the Billboard Hot 100.

The song was featured in the film A Prophet, directed by Jacques Audiard. It plays over the closing credits of the 2018 action-horror film Overlord.

Music video
The music video was directed by Diane Martel and shows Nas and Olu Dara on a stage with women dancing in the background. It also shows a few shots that are supposed to be Nas in school. At the end of the video, Dara stands still next to Nas and says with a smile, "Rest in peace, Ray Charles," as a sign of respect. (Charles had died in the summer of 2004.) The video had high rotation on MTV and BET.

Track listing

A-side
 "Bridging The Gap" (Album Version) (4:00) 
 "Bridging The Gap" (Instrumental) (3:57) 
 "Bridging The Gap" (A Cappella) (3:57)

B-side
 "Bridging The Gap" (Album Version) (4:00) 
 "Bridging The Gap" (Instrumental) (3:57) 
 "Bridging The Gap" (A Cappella) (3:57)

Charts

Release history

References

2004 singles
2004 songs
Nas songs
Columbia Records singles
Music videos directed by Diane Martel
Songs written by Nas
Song recordings produced by Salaam Remi
Songs written by Salaam Remi
Jazz rap songs